Sharon Bryant (born August 14, 1956, Westchester County, New York) is an American R&B singer. She began her career as the lead singer of the R&B group Atlantic Starr in 1976.

Career
Bryant sang lead on songs such as "When Love Calls" and "Circles". She left the group in pursuit of a solo career in 1984, and had moderate solo success with that effort. She would not achieve success on her own again until five years later, when the ballad "Foolish Heart" reached the top ten on Billboard's R&B chart. Another major R&B hit from the accompanying self-titled album, "Let Go" was also a moderate pop hit, cracking the top 40 on the pop charts (at #34) and charting at No. 37 on Radio & Records Magazine's Top 100.

In 2013, Bryant appeared as a background vocalist on Empire of the Sun's second album Ice on the Dune on the song "Keep a Watch".

Discography

Albums

Singles

References

External links

American rhythm and blues singers
People from Westchester County, New York
1956 births
Living people
Atlantic Starr members
20th-century American singers
20th-century American women singers
21st-century American women singers